Julius Joseph "Moose" Solters (born Julius Joseph Soltesz; March 22, 1906 – September 28, 1975) was a major league outfielder between 1934 and 1943.

Career
Solters played nine seasons in the American League, for four different teams; the Boston Red Sox (125 games), St. Louis Browns (319 games), Cleveland Indians (260 games), and Chicago White Sox (234 games). During his major league career, he appeared in a total of 938 games, batting .289 with 83 home runs and 599 RBIs. He hit for the cycle on August 19, 1934, while with the Red Sox.

On August 2, 1941, while playing for Chicago at Griffith Stadium in  Washington, D.C., Solters was struck by an errant baseball during a pregame warmup. The thrown ball fractured his skull and has been attributed to his going blind two years later. Solters died in 1975 in his hometown of Pittsburgh, and is buried in Calvary Cemetery there.

See also

 List of Major League Baseball players to hit for the cycle

References

Further reading

External links
, or Retrosheet
 

1906 births
1975 deaths
Boston Red Sox players
Chicago White Sox players
Cleveland Indians players
St. Louis Browns players
Baseball players from Pittsburgh
Burials at Calvary Catholic Cemetery (Pittsburgh)